Matthew Alexander (born January 30, 1947 in Shreveport, Louisiana) is a retired Major League baseball player. He was a utility player for the Chicago Cubs 1973–1974, Oakland Athletics 1975–1977 and Pittsburgh Pirates 1978–1981. He holds the record for most appearances as a pinch runner in MLB history.

Playing career
In his later years, Alexander was used mostly as a pinch runner by manager Chuck Tanner, and so earned the sobriquet "Matt the Scat."  Tanner had managed in Oakland in 1976 and brought Alexander to Pittsburgh after he became manager of the Pirates.  Alexander helped the Athletics win the 1975 American League Western Division and the Pirates win the 1979 World Series.  He played every non-pitching position in his major league career except catcher and first base.

In nine seasons he played in 374 games and had 168 at-bats, 111 runs, 36 hits, 4 doubles, 2 triples, 4 RBI, 103 stolen bases, 18 walks, a .214 batting average, an .294 on-base percentage, .262 slugging percentage, 44 total bases, 8 sacrifice hits and 1 intentional walk. He is one of only seven players (excluding pitchers) to have played at least 100 games and have more games played than at-bats.

References

External links

Pura Pelota (Venezuelan Winter League)

1947 births
Living people
African-American baseball players
American expatriate baseball players in Mexico
Rojos del Águila de Veracruz players
Baseball players from Shreveport, Louisiana
Buffalo Bisons (minor league) players
Caldwell Cubs players
Chicago Cubs players
Grambling State Tigers baseball players
Major League Baseball center fielders
Major League Baseball designated hitters
Midland Cubs players
Navegantes del Magallanes players
Oakland Athletics players
Pittsburgh Pirates players
Quincy Cubs players
San Antonio Missions players
Tigres del México players
Truchas de Toluca players
Wichita Aeros players
Winter Haven Super Sox players
American expatriate baseball players in Venezuela
21st-century African-American people
20th-century African-American sportspeople